Geordie in Wonderland may refer to:

 "Geordie in Wonderland" (song), a song by The Wildhearts
 Geordie in Wonderland (album), a 2006 live album by The Wildhearts